Lee Feeney (born 21 March 1978 in Kilkeel) is a Northern Irish footballer who manages Bangor F.C. in the Premier Intermediate League in Northern Ireland.

Playing career
Feeney began his career at Ards. He made 4 appearances for Ards in the 1997 UEFA Intertoto Cup. He left to join Linfield and made his debut for them back in February 1997 before moving to Rangers for £10,000,000 in December 1998. He made 126 appearances, his first during a 4–0 league win verses Dundee in January 1999. Three seasons later he re-joined Linfield. During his second spell at Windsor Park he scored in the UEFA Cup.

He left again in 2002 for Ards then had a spell with Glenavon before signing for Shamrock Rovers for the 2005 season. He scored on his debut on live television  but did not score again in 11 total appearances and was released in July. He then joined Bangor before joining Newry City.

His brother Cullen also plays for Newry. His cousin Warren Feeney is a former Northern Ireland international, and past manager of Linfield. His two uncles were also internationals.

Managerial career
Lee's first steps into Management were confirmed when announced as the new Manager of Mid Ulster Football League Intermediate A side Banbridge Rangers F.C. on 3 June 2016. Feeney departed the club on 17 July 2018 having taken the club within one point of winning the Intermediate A league title. Feeney returned to coaching in March 2019, serving as part of cousin Warren's coaching staff at Ards before leaving in June following the club's relegation to the second division.

Feeney was appointed Bangor manager on 4 June 2020.

References

External links

Profile at Newry City
Career stats

1978 births
Living people
People from Kilkeel
Association footballers from Northern Ireland
National Soccer League (Australia) players
Scottish Premier League players
Ards F.C. players
Bangor F.C. players
Glenavon F.C. players
Linfield F.C. players
Newry City F.C. players
Northern Spirit FC players
Rangers F.C. players
Shamrock Rovers F.C. players
League of Ireland players
NIFL Premiership players
Association football forwards